The Wales men's national under-18 basketball team is a national basketball team of Wales, administered by the Basketball Wales. It represents the country in men's international under-18 basketball competitions.

The team won three medals at the FIBA U18 European Championship Division C.

See also
Wales men's national basketball team
Wales men's national under-16 basketball team
Wales women's national under-18 basketball team

References

Basketball in Wales
Men's national under-18 basketball teams
Basketball